Northwest Francophone Education Region No. 1, known in French as Conseil scolaire du Nord-Ouest No. 1, is a French first language authority within the Canadian province of Alberta operated out of St. Isidore.

 the school operates 3 schools in Peace River, Grande Prairie, and Falher.

See also 
List of school authorities in Alberta

References

External links 

School districts in Alberta
French-language school districts in Canada
Northern Alberta
Peace River Country
French-language schools in Alberta